In quantum probability, the Belavkin equation, also known as Belavkin-Schrödinger equation, quantum filtering equation, stochastic master equation, is a quantum stochastic differential equation describing the dynamics of a quantum system undergoing observation in continuous time.  It was derived and henceforth studied by Viacheslav Belavkin in 1988.

Overview
Unlike the Schrödinger equation, which describes the deterministic evolution of the wavefunction  of a closed system (without interaction), the Belavkin equation describes the stochastic evolution of a random wavefunction  of an open quantum system interacting with an observer:

Note that this noise has dependent increments with respect to the output probability measure  representing the output innovation process (the observation). For , the equation becomes the standard Schrödinger equation.

The stochastic process  can be a mixture of two basic types: the Poisson (or jump) type , where  is a Poisson process corresponding to counting observation, and the Brownian (or diffusion) type , where  is the standard Wiener process corresponding to continuous observation.  The equations of the diffusion type can be derived as the central limit of the jump type equations with the expected rate of the jumps increasing to infinity.

The random wavefunction  is normalized only in the mean-squared sense , but generally  fails to be normalized for each . The stochastic process  in the posterior equation has independent increments with respect to the output probability measure , but not with respect to the input measure. Belavkin also derived linear equation for unnormalized density operator  and the corresponding nonlinear equation for the normalized random posterior density operator . For two types of measurement noise, this gives eight basic quantum stochastic differential equations. The general forms of the equations include all types of noise and their representations in Fock space.

The nonlinear equation describing observation of position of a free particle, which is a special case of the posterior Belavkin equation of the diffusion type, was also obtained by Diosi and appeared in the works of Gisin, Ghirardi, Pearle and Rimini, although with a rather different motivation or interpretation.  Similar nonlinear equations for posterior density operators were postulated (although without derivation) in quantum optics and the quantum trajectories theory, where they are called stochastic master equations.  The averaging of the equations for the random density operators  over all random trajectories  leads to the Lindblad equation, which is deterministic.

The nonlinear Belavkin equations for posterior states play the same role as the Stratonovich–Kushner equation in classical probability, while the linear equations correspond to the Zakai equation.  The Belavkin equations describe continuous-time decoherence of initially pure state  into a mixed posterior state  giving a rigorous description of the dynamics of the wavefunction collapse due to an observation or measurement.

Non-demolition measurement and quantum filtering 
Noncommutativity presents a major challenge for probabilistic interpretation of quantum stochastic differential equations due to non-existence of conditional expectations for general pairs of quantum observables. Belavkin resolved this issue by discovering the error-perturbation uncertainty relation and formulating the non-demolition principle of quantum measurement. In particular, if the stochastic process  corresponds to the error  (white noise in the diffusive case) of a noisy observation  of operator  with the accuracy coefficient , then the indirect observation perturbs the dynamics of the system by a stochastic force , called the Langevin force, which is another white noise of intensity  that does not commute with the error . The result of such a perturbation is that the output process  is commutative , and hence  corresponds to a classical observation, while the system operators  satisfy the non-demolition condition: all future observables must commute with the past observations (but not with the future observations):  for all  (but not ). The non-demolition condition is necessary and sufficient for the existence of conditional expectations , which makes the quantum filtering possible.

Posterior state equations

Counting observation 
Let  be a Poisson process with forward increments  almost everywhere and  otherwise and having the property . Then substituting  for the stochastic process  gives the linear Belavkin equation for the unnormalized random wavefunction  undergoing counting observation.

Normalized wavefunction  is called the posterior state vector, the evolution of which is described by the following nonlinear equation

where  has expectation .  The posterior equation can be written in the standard form

The corresponding equations for the unnormalized random density operator  and for the normalized random posterior density operator  are as follows

where .  Note that the latter equation is nonlinear.

Continuous observation 

Therefore,  becomes standard Wiener process with respect to the input probability measure. Substituting  for  gives the linear Belavkin equation for the unnormalized random wavefunction  undergoing continuous observation. The output process  becomes the diffusion innovation process  with increments . The nonlinear Belavkin equation of the diffusion type for the posterior state vector  is

The corresponding equations for the unnormalized random density operator  and for the normalized random posterior density operator  are as follows

where .  The second equation is nonlinear due to normalization.  Because , taking the average of these stochastic equations over all  leads to the Lindblad equation

Example: continuous observation of position of a free particle 

Consider a free particle of mass . Making the following substitutions in the Belavkin equation

the posterior stochastic equation becomes

Motivated by the spontaneous collapse theory rather than the filtering theory, this equation was also obtained by Diosi, showing that the measurement noise  is the increment  of a standard Wiener process. There are closed-form solutions to this equation,  as well as equations for a particle in a linear or quadratic potentials. For a Gaussian initial state  these solutions correspond to optimal quantum linear filter. Solutions to the Belavkin equation show that in the limit  the wavefunction has finite dispersion, therefore resolving the quantum Zeno effect.

References 

Quantum measurement
Equations